Fernando González (born 30 April 1969) is a Spanish judoka.

Achievements

References

1969 births
Living people
Spanish male judoka
Judoka at the 2000 Summer Olympics
Olympic judoka of Spain
Goodwill Games medalists in judo
Mediterranean Games silver medalists for Spain
Mediterranean Games bronze medalists for Spain
Mediterranean Games medalists in judo
Competitors at the 1993 Mediterranean Games
Competitors at the 1997 Mediterranean Games
Competitors at the 1994 Goodwill Games
20th-century Spanish people
21st-century Spanish people